Gentle Rain may refer to:

"The Gentle Rain", a 1965 bossa nova song composed by Luis Bonfá
Gentle Rain (Irene Kral album), 1977
Gentle Rain (John Hicks album), 1994
The Gentle Rain (film), a 1966 American-Brazilian drama film